Rashid Al-Owjan (born 1 January 1968) is a Qatari male taekwondo athlete. He represented Qatar at the 1988 Summer Olympics in the men's welterweight (-76 kg) category and the 1986 Asian Games in men's featherweight (-68 kg) category, winning the bronze medal in the latter.

References

1968 births
Qatari athletes
Qatari male taekwondo practitioners
Olympic taekwondo practitioners of Qatar
Taekwondo practitioners at the 1986 Asian Games
Taekwondo practitioners at the 1988 Summer Olympics
Asian Games bronze medalists for Qatar
Asian Games medalists in taekwondo
Medalists at the 1986 Asian Games
Living people